Damião Barbosa de Araújo (27 September 1778 – 20 April 1856) was a Brazilian composer. He was born on the Island of Itaparica and died in the city of Salvador. He is most known for his opera A intriga amorosa, which premiered in 1810 at the Teatro do Guadelupe in Salvador.  Araújo was the son of a shoemaker and worked for the Brotherhood of Santa Cecilia from 1819. He joined the orchestra of the Imperial Chapel in Rio de Janeiro as a violinist in 1822. In this period he met the organist and composer Marcos Portugal (1762-1830) and José Maurício Nunes Garcia (1767-1830). Araújo returned to Salvador in to become the Master of Music of the Cathedral of Salvador in 1818, succeeding Alexandre da Fonseca. Araújo composed a work for full orchestra for the reopening and dedication mass of the Church of the Third Order of Saint Francis; it was performed on July 5, 1835. The score for the work is stored in the archive of the church.

References

1778 births
1856 deaths
Brazilian classical composers
Brazilian opera composers
Male classical composers
Male opera composers
19th-century Brazilian male musicians